Grand Parc de L'Ouest is a planned park along the north shore of the western part of Montreal, Quebec, Canada.

The plan is to combine the following into one large park:

 L'Anse-à-l'Orme Nature Park
 Bois-de-l'Île-Bizard Nature Park
 Bois-de-la-Roche Agricultural Park
 Cap-Saint-Jacques Nature Park
 Rapides du Cheval Blanc Park
 Various areas of interest located in boroughs or related municipalities

It has the potential to become Canada's largest municipal park.

Among its aims are to protect natural environments and to preserve biodiversity

History
On August 8, 2019, the City of Montreal announced the planned creation of the park in order to protect the natural spaces of Montreal's West Island.

In 2021, a 240-page report of the Grand Parc de l'Ouest public consultation was made available.

References

Geography of Montreal